Pakistan: A hard country is a historical book authored by award-winning British author and journalist Anatol Lieven. The books was published by Penguin Random House in 2011.

Reception
Indian author Pankaj Mishra writing for The Guardian said, "Lieven's book is refreshingly free of the condescension that many western writers, conditioned to see their own societies as the apogees of civilization, bring to Asian countries, assessing them solely in terms of how far they have approximated western political and economic institutions and practices." British Pakistani writer Mohammed Hanif reviewed the books for The New York Times and said, "A Hard Country" is described by its publisher as "a magisterial investigation." The sheer scope of the book is proof of that."
In The Daily Telegraph review, Peter Oborne wrote "the book is full of wisdom and humor." Lisa Kaaki of Arab News said, 
“This book gives an insight into the soul of Pakistan, a country often misunderstood and wrongly portrayed in the media" The Independent called the book, "a finely researched blend of the nation's 64-year history."

References

British writers
British journalists
Books about Pakistan